Rozovsky is a masculine surname of Jewish origin, its feminine counterpart is Rozovskaya. It may refer to
Boris Rozovsky (born 1945), American applied mathematician
Eduard Rozovsky (1926–2011), Russian cinematographer and cameraman
Shmuel Rozovsky (1913–1979), Talmudic lecturer in Israel